The Screen  is an arthouse cinema, open to the public, located on the midtown campus owned by the city of Santa Fe, New Mexico. Founded in 1999 and curated by Brent Kliewer, The Screen shows world, art, and independent cinema, as well as international performances of operas, ballets, and plays via satellite. It was used by the now-defunct Santa Fe University of Art and Design’s Moving Image Arts Department on the campus to show films for courses and student clubs.

Facilities

Built in a former soundstage, The Screen has stadium seating, a 16-speaker Dolby Digital surround sound system, and 35-mm and digital projection on a high-definition curved screen approximately half the size of an IMAX screen. The Screen also utilizes analog sound readers, maximizing the ability to play mono and surround EX prints, and operates simplex changeover projectors with adjustable shutter capabilities to play silent film prints. A satellite receiver is also used to display live operas, plays, and ballets.

Curator
Brent Kliewer has been programming films in Santa Fe since 1982. A film curator, writer, and critic, Kliewer founded Santa Fe’s Jean Cocteau Cinema in 1983 and in 1986 began building the film program at the Center for Contemporary Arts in Santa Fe. Kliewer was a film critic at the Santa Fe New Mexican and spent five years as a professor of critical studies in the Moving Image Arts Department at the then College of Santa Fe (later Santa Fe University of Art and Design). In the late 1990s, Kliewer helped to design The Screen.

Notable guests
The following individuals presented films to audiences at The Screen: 
 Alan Arkin, actor   
 Cate Blanchett, actress   
 Steve Buscemi, actor  
 Lucien Castaing-Taylor, filmmaker  
 Alan Cumming, actor   
 Emilio Estevez, actor   
 Coleen Gray, actress  
 Dave Grusin, composer   
 Mariette Hartley, actress  
 Stan Herd, artist  
 Don Hertzfeldt, animator   
 Marsha Hunt, actress   
 Juraj Jakubisko, director  
 Burt Kennedy, actor     
 László Kovács, cinematographer   
 Ellen Kuras, cinematographer   
 Lisa Law, photographer/activist   
 Larry McMurtry, screenwriter   
 Eddie Muller, film historian  
 John Pilger, filmmaker and journalist
 Robert Redford, actor  
 Mickey Rooney, actor   
 Gaylen Ross, filmmaker   
 Martin Sheen, actor   
 Alain Silver, film historian   
 Stephen Sommers, director   
 Wes Studi, actor   
 John Toll, cinematographer  
 Constance Towers, actress   
 Guinevere Turner, filmmaker   
 Amy Vincent, cinematographer   
 Vilmos Zsigmond, cinematographer

References

Tourist attractions in Santa Fe, New Mexico
Theatres in New Mexico
Event venues established in 1999
1999 establishments in New Mexico